Le Premier Cercle (The First Circle), also known as Inside Ring and The Dead List in English and as Ultimate Heist on USA video, is a 2009 French-language film by Laurent Tuel.

It tells the story of Milo Malakian (Jean Reno), a gang leader in France, and his son Anton, the descendants of Armenian genocide survivors.

Having been co-produced by Thelma Films and Alter Films, this thriller formerly called Riviera was co-written by the scriptwriters Laurent Tuel, Laurent Turner and Simon Moutaïrou.

Production companies include TF1 and Canal+.

According to producer Alain Terzian, the surname of the film's hero, Malakian, was chosen in regard of film director Henri Verneuil, a friend of Terzian.

Cast
Jean Reno as Milo Malakian
Gaspard Ulliel as Anton Malakian
Vahina Giocante as Elodie
Sami Bouajila as Saunier

References

External links
 
 
 
 Notes de Prod. : Le Premier cercle, Entretien avec Jean Reno, 2009
  Le Premier cercle at AlloCiné
  LE PREMIER CERCLE videos at Canalplus

French crime action films
2009 films
Films set in France
Armenian genocide films
French gangster films
Films about organized crime in France
2000s French films